The name Gardo has been used for two tropical cyclones in the Philippines by PAGASA in the Western Pacific Ocean.

 Typhoon Maria (2018) (T1808, 10W, Gardo) – a Category 5 super typhoon which affected the Marianas, the Ryukyu Islands, Taiwan and China.
 Tropical Depression 13W (2022) (13W, Gardo) – Formed over the Philippine Sea, absorbed by the circulation around Typhoon Hinnamnor.

Pacific typhoon set index articles